Adam Kennedy (born May 11, 1991) is an American football quarterback who is currently a free agent. He was invited to mini-camp with the Chicago Bears as an undrafted free agent in 2014. He played college football at Arkansas State University after transferring out of Utah State University and San Joaquin Delta College.

College career

College career statistics

Professional career
Kennedy was rated as the 32nd best quarterback in the 2014 NFL Draft by NFLDraftScout.com.

New Orleans VooDoo
After failing to make the Chicago Bears following their mini-camp, Kennedy was assigned to the New Orleans VooDoo of the Arena Football League. In his first week with the team, he beat out fellow rookie, Brian Hudson, to become the VooDoo starting quarterback. Kennedy started the final seven games for the VooDoo, leading them to a 1–6 recording during that time. 
In September 2014, the VooDoo picked up Kennedy's rookie option to retain him for the 2015 season.

Tampa Bay Storm
On December 7, 2015, Kennedy was assigned to the Tampa Bay Storm.

AFL statistics

Stats from ArenaFan:

References

External links
Arkansas State bio 
Arena Football League bio 

1991 births
Living people
American football quarterbacks
Arkansas State Red Wolves football players
Delta College Mustangs football players
New Orleans VooDoo players
Players of American football from California
Sportspeople from Elk Grove, California
Tampa Bay Storm players
Utah State Aggies football players